The Price to Pay is a 2007 French comedy film directed by Alexandra Leclère.

Cast 
 Christian Clavier - Jean-Pierre Ménard
 Nathalie Baye - Odile Ménard
 Gérard Lanvin - Richard
 Géraldine Pailhas - Caroline
 Patrick Chesnais - Grégoire
 Anaïs Demoustier - Justine Ménard

References

External links 

2007 comedy films
2007 films
French comedy films
2000s French films
2000s French-language films